Score Productions is an American musical production company specializing in background music and themes for television shows. Started in 1963 in a brownstone townhouse on the Upper East Side of Manhattan by music producer Bob Israel, Score has created some of the most recognizable tunes in America — most identifiable by just a few notes.

Among the composers who worked for Score Productions are Charles Fox, Walt Levinsky, Arthur B. Rubinstein, Dick Lieb, Michel Camilo, Chuck Loeb, Billy Barber, Irving "Benny" Robbin, Charles Gross, Glen Daum, Birch Johnson, and Les Fradkin.

Legacy
One of the Score-produced compositions, "Come on Down", also known as the theme song from The Price Is Right, would eventually become a number one hit on Billboards Dance Club Songs Chart for Crystal Waters in 2001. The single also marked the first time that a television theme song (and one that came from a game show) reached number one on a Dance chart, and the first to feature lyrics.

Selected credits of Score Productions music composers

 Billy Barber - All My Children, American Chronicles
 Bob Israel  – ABC World News Tonight Theme, All My Children, Another World, The Doctors, The Red Hand Gang.
 Michel Camilo – Goodwill Games, One Life to Live, Match Game (1998), Press Your Luck (1983), Loving, High Rollers (1987), The All New Let's Make A Deal (1984)
 Charles Fox  – ABC's Wide World of Sports, To Tell the Truth (1969), The Match Game, What's My Line?, Rhyme and Reason
 Charles Gross – The Doctors
 Edd Kalehoff – The Price Is Right, Concentration, Tattletales (1974), Trivia Trap, Card Sharks (1986)
 Walt Levinsky – Family Feud, 20/20, Password Plus, The Price Is Right (1976 music package)
 Dick Lieb and Walt Levinsky – Swiss Family Robinson, WWII, A G.I. Diary, Search and Rescue, Dr. Simon Locke, Police Surgeon, Lovers and Friends
 Les Fradkin – One Life to Live, Capitol, Loving, various game shows
 Chuck Loeb – CNN Main Theme and various CNN cues/shows
 Arthur B. Rubinstein – The Doctors, Another World, The Red Hand Gang (theme), Sportsworld, WWII-A GI Diary, All-New Beat the Clock, Strange Paradise, The Starlost, Norman Corwin Presents, Harvey, The Price, All the Way Home, Look Homeward Angel
 Paul Epstein - Body Language, Classic Concentration, Hit Man
 Gary Anderson - Child's Play, Super Password

Credits of Score Productions

ABC
 ABC World News Tonight
America This Morning
 20/20
 This Week with David Brinkley
 Nightline
 Monday Night Football
 ABC Space Shuttle
 The Royal Wedding
 Wide World of Sports
 ABC Superstars
 ABC International Championship Boxing
 Battle of the Network Stars
 Primetime Monday
 John Ritter Remembered
 Major League Baseball Game of the Week
 ABC's Wide World of Entertainment Theme
 The Kentucky Derby
 Preakness Stakes
 The Championships, Wimbledon Tennis
 Indianapolis 500
 ABC Movies
 One Life to Live
 General Hospital
 All My Children
 Loving
 ABC Basketball
 ABC Bowling
 Good Morning America 1998–1999
 The John Stossel Specials
 ABC Radio News
 The Big Showdown (Don Lipp-Ron Greenberg Productions)
 The Money Maze (Daphne-Don Lipp Productions)
 Rhyme and Reason (W.T. Naud Productions)
 ABC World News This Morning

NBC
 Search for Tomorrow (CBS/NBC-Procter & Gamble)
 Another World (NBC-Procter & Gamble)
 The Doctors (NBC-Colgate Palmolive)
 Texas (NBC-Procter & Gamble)
 The Dr. Dean Show

HBO
 HBO Feature Presentation theme

CNN
 Worldview
 Newsday
 Morning News
 Today
 Early Edition
 Weekend A.M. News
 CNNfn
 CNN Theme (Turner)
 Larry King Live
 Managing With Lou Dobbs

RTL Group/Fremantle (including Goodson-Todman assets)
 Password (CBS/ABC) 1961–1967, 1971–1975
 To Tell the Truth (CBS/SYN/NBC/ABC)  1967–1968, 1969–1978, 1980–1981, 1990–1991, 2000–2002, 2016–present
 Match Game (NBC/CBS/ABC/SYN) 1967–1969, 1973–1982, 1990–1991, 1998–1999, 2016–2021
 What's My Line? (SYN) 1968–1975
 The Price Is Right (CBS/SYN) 1972–present
 I've Got a Secret (CBS/SYN) 1972–1973, 1976 
 Concentration (SYN) 1973–1978
 Tattletales (CBS/SYN) 1974–1978, 1982–1984
 Double Dare (CBS) 1976–1977
 Family Feud (ABC/CBS/SYN) 1976–1985, 1988–1995, 1999–present
 Card Sharks (NBC/SYN/CBS/ABC) 1978–1981, 1986–1989
 Beat the Clock (CBS) 1979–1980
 Password Plus (NBC) 1979–1982
 Child's Play (CBS) 1982–1983
 Body Language (CBS) 1984–1986
 Super Password (NBC) 1984–1989
 Classic Concentration (NBC) 1987–1991

CBS
 Face the Nation
 The Early Show
 Up to the Minute
 On Our Own
 Press Your Luck 1983–1986
 Mighty Mouse: The New Adventures (Bakshi Animation)
 Guiding Light
 Hulk Hogan's Rock 'n' Wrestling (WWE)

Turner Broadcasting System
 Turner Sports
 HLN
 NCAA Football
 NBA on TBS

OTHER
 Great Chefs of the East (PBS, Discovery)
 Chip 'n Dale: Rescue Rangers (Walt Disney Television and Disney–ABC Domestic Television, theme song composed by Mark Mueller and produced by Alf Clausen)  
 The Butter Battle Book (Dr. Seuss Special/TNT)
 A Gorey Halloween (J. Walter Thompson)
 Get Smart (Talent Associates)
 High Rollers (Merrill Heatter/Orion, 1987–1988)
 Marlo and the Magic Movie Machine
 The Starlost
 The All-New Let's Make a Deal (Hatos-Hall, syndicated 1984–86)
 Perfect Match (Lorimar-Telepictures, syndicated 1986)
 The $1,000,000 Chance of a Lifetime (Lorimar-Telepictures, syndicated 1986–87)
 Trump Card (Telepictures/Warner Bros., syndicated 1990–91)

INTERNATIONAL
 América Television (Peru)
 Asia Television (Hong Kong)
 NHK (Japan)
 Seven Network (Australia)
 Television Nacional de Chile (Chile)

References

External links
Score Productions Production Music on Internet Archive

Theme music
Television music
American television composers
American companies established in 1963
Mass media companies established in 1963